The Governor Edmund G. Brown California Aqueduct is a system of canals, tunnels, and pipelines that conveys water collected from the Sierra Nevada Mountains and valleys of Northern and Central California to Southern California. Named after California Governor Edmund Gerald "Pat" Brown Sr., the over  aqueduct is the principal feature of the California State Water Project.

The aqueduct begins at the Clifton Court Forebay at the southwestern corner of the Sacramento–San Joaquin River Delta. The aqueduct then heads south, eventually splitting into three branches: the Coastal Branch, ending at Lake Cachuma in Santa Barbara County; the West Branch, conveying water to Castaic Lake in Los Angeles County; and the East Branch, connecting Silverwood Lake in San Bernardino County.

The Department of Water Resources (DWR) operates and maintains the California Aqueduct, including one pumped-storage hydroelectric plant, Gianelli Power Plant. Gianelli is located at the base of San Luis Dam, which forms San Luis Reservoir, the largest offstream reservoir in the United States.

The Castaic Power Plant, while similar and which is owned and operated by the Los Angeles Department of Water and Power, is located on the northern end of Castaic Lake, while Castaic Dam is located at the southern end.

Land subsidence has occurred along the aqueduct and has had a steady increase since its relatively stable state post construction of the aqueduct.

The aqueduct system

The aqueduct serves 35 million people and 5.7 million acres of farmland, and begins at the San Joaquin-Sacramento River Delta at the Banks Pumping Plant, which pumps from the Clifton Court Forebay. Water is pumped by the Banks Pumping Plant to the Bethany Reservoir. The reservoir serves as a forebay for the South Bay Aqueduct via the South Bay Pumping Plant. After the coastal branch, the line continues by gravity another  to the Buena Vista Pumping Plant. South of the plant the west branch splits off in a southwesterly direction to serve the Los Angeles Basin. At Edmonston Pumping Plant it is pumped  over the Tehachapi Mountains.

Water flows through the aqueduct in a series of abrupt rises and gradual falls.  The water flows down a long segment, built at a slight grade, and arrives at a pumping station powered by Path 66 or Path 15.  The pumping station raises the water, where it again gradually flows downhill to the next station. However, where there are substantial drops, the water's potential energy is recaptured by hydroelectric plants. The initial pumping station fed by the Sacramento River Delta raises the water , while a series of pumps culminating at the Edmonston Pumping Plant raises the water  over the Tehachapi Mountains. The Edmonston Pumping station requires so much power that several power lines off of Path 15 and Path 26 are needed to ensure proper operation of the pumps.

While electricity generated by the solar panels could be used by the aqueduct's pumping systems, the study also considered the possibility of supplying power to irrigation systems in the Central Valley to reduce reliance on diesel-powered irrigation pumps. Similar canal-spanning solar installations have been demonstrated in India, including a steel truss design in Gujarat and a suspension cable design Punjab.

Branches
From its beginning until its first branch, the aqueduct passes through parts of Contra Costa, Alameda, San Joaquin, Stanislaus, Merced, Fresno, and Kings counties. The aqueduct then divides into three branches: the Coastal Branch in the Central Valley, and the East and West Branches after passing over the Tehachapi Mountains.

Coastal Branch
Phase I, an above-ground aqueduct totaling  from where it branches from the California Aqueduct, was completed in 1968. The Central Coast Water Authority (CCWA) extension, completed in 1997, is a (30–39 in) (76–99 cm) diameter pipeline that travels  from Vandenberg through Vandenberg Village, Lompoc, Buellton, and Solvang where it terminates at Lake Cachuma in Los Padres National Forest.

Coastal Branch facilities include:
 Las Perillas Pumping Plant
 Badger Hill Pumping Plant
 Devil's Den Pumping Plant
 Bluestone Pumping Plant
 Polonio Pass Pumping Plant
 Polonio Pass Water Treatment Plant
 Cuesta Tunnel
 Santa Ynez Pumping Facility

East Branch

The aqueduct splits off into the East Branch and West Branch in extreme southern Kern County, north of the Los Angeles County line. The East Branch supplies Lake Palmdale and terminates at Lake Perris, in the area of the San Gorgonio Pass. It passes through parts of Kern, Los Angeles, San Bernardino, and Riverside counties.

East Branch facilities include:
 Tehachapi East Afterbay
 Alamo Power Plant
 Pearblossom Pumping Plant
 Mojave Siphon
 Mojave Siphon Power Plant
 Cedar Springs Dam
 Silverwood Lake
 San Bernardino Intake Structure
 San Bernardino Tunnel
 Devil Canyon Power Plant
 Devil Canyon Afterbay 1 and Afterbay 2
 Greenspot Pump Station (Backup)
 Citrus Reservoir
 Citrus Pump Station
 Crafton Hills Reservoir
 Crafton Hills Pump Station
 Cherry Valley Pump Station
 Perris Lake and Dam

West Branch
The West Branch continues to head towards its terminus at Pyramid Lake and Castaic Lake in the Angeles National Forest to supply the western Los Angeles basin. It passes through parts of Kern and Los Angeles counties.

West Branch facilities include
 Oso Pumping Plant
 Peace Valley Pipeline
 Warne Powerplant
 Angeles Tunnel
 Castaic Power Plant

Bikeway
This path was closed in 1988 due to bicyclist safety and liability issues. It is expected to remain closed indefinitely due to the continued liability issues and an increased focus on security, especially after the September 11, 2001 attacks.

Pumping stations
 Phase I, canal
 Las Perillas Pumping Plant , Kings County
 Badger Hill Pumping Plant , Kings County

 Phase II, pipeline and tunnel
 Devil's Den Pumping Plant  , Kern County
 Bluestone Pumping Plant  , Kern County
 Polonio Pass Pumping Plant , San Luis Obispo County

Hydrography

Two major river systems drain and define the two parts of the Central Valley. Their impact on the California Aqueduct is both direct and indirect.

In the south part of the San Joaquin Valley, the alluvial fan of the Kings River and another one from Coast Ranges streams have created a divide and resultantly the currently dry Tulare basin of the Central Valley, into which flow four major Sierra Nevada rivers, the Kings, Kaweah, Tule and Kern. This basin, usually endorheic, formerly filled during heavy snowmelt and spilled out into the San Joaquin River. Called Tulare Lake, it is usually dry nowadays because the rivers feeding it have been diverted for agricultural purposes.

The rivers of the Central Valley converge in the Sacramento-San Joaquin Delta, a complex network of marshy channels, distributaries and sloughs that wind around islands mainly used for agriculture. Here the freshwater of the rivers merges with tidewater, and eventually reach the Pacific Ocean after passing through Suisun Bay, San Pablo Bay, upper San Francisco Bay and finally the Golden Gate. Many of the islands now lie below sea level because of intensive agriculture, and have a high risk of flooding, which would cause salt water to rush back into the delta, especially when there is too little fresh water flowing in from the Valley.

Over 25 million people, living both in the valley and in other regions of the state, rely on the water carried by these rivers.

Land subsidence

Background 
Land subsidence is when the land gradually or suddenly sinks or settles due to movement or removal of natural materials such as water, minerals, oil and natural gases. More often than not, subsidence occurs when large quantities of groundwater are removed from sediment or rocks. This often occurs due to human interference, but can also happen from natural phenomena. Subsidence can happen over very large areas or small little sections of land. This has occurred along the California Aqueduct of the State Water Project since construction. 

Human causes include; pumping, mining and fracking.

Natural causes include; earthquakes, erosion, glacial movement, soil compaction and the formation of sinkholes.

Groundwater use and pumping in the area was the major water use for farmers and agriculture in the 1920s, and over time, this over-pumping resulted in land subsidence and a decline in groundwater-level resources. In time, this resulted in major land subsidence by the 1970's with local areas having 1 to 28 feet of subsidence. With the creation and use of the California Aqueduct along these regions, surface water being transported put a halt on significant compaction and a recovery in ground water levels now with less ground water pumping.  The aqueduct has been increasing in subsidence rates rapidly, even though it was relatively stable for many years after being constructed.  The Tulare Basin is subsiding at a rate of about one foot per year, as measured by NASA's GRACE satellite.

Measurement 
Measurement of this subsidence is done in a few ways. Originally, subsidence was recorded based on land surveying, repeating the surveying, and along with monitoring compaction by recording the data from extensometers at multiple sites. Since then, Global Positioning Systems (GPS) has been used along with land surveying to record subsidence and compaction. More recently, interferometric synthetic aperture radar (InSAR) has been used to monitor subsidence along with GPS. InSAR is being used to recreate maps to closely watch the progression of the land around the aqueduct.

Consequences 
Subsidence can put land, both private and public, at risk of infrastructure damage. Bridges, levees, roads, and groundwater wells are either at risk of damage or have been damaged already. With subsidence progression, underground aquifers could be at risk and water storage from them could be threatened. Damage and sinking of the canal of the aqueduct has already occurred from subsidence which has made the canal less reliable. Capacity has been compromised due to damage to the canals and therefore has caused problems and delays with delivering the water across the state, as well as higher rates and costs for power and operation.

In popular culture 
A documentary about the decline of the United States' infrastructure, The Crumbling of America, was commissioned by the U.S. A&E network in the late 2000s. The documentary is typically shown on the History television channel in the United States, although other educational broadcasters globally have shown it. It features the Clifton Court Forebay (a primary intake point for California Aqueduct) as a "strategic piece of California freshwater infrastructure" subject to shutdown for up to two years if struck by an earthquake of magnitude 7.5 or greater.

The aqueduct is featured in an episode of California's Gold with Huell Howser.

See also
 Colorado River Aqueduct
 Los Angeles Aqueduct

References

External links 

 The California Department of Water Resources website
 Historic Pump-Storage Operation in WSCC
 USGS Geographic Names Information System data
 
 
 
 

Aqueducts in California
California State Water Project
Interbasin transfer
Central Valley (California)
Southern California
Transportation buildings and structures in California
Water in California